Tilley is a Canadian community in Victoria County, New Brunswick. It is a heavily wooded farming community between Route 105 and 390 between Perth-Andover and Grand Falls. Tilley encompasses a large area and can be subdivided in North Tilley, South Tilley, Lerwick and Currie Rd.

History

In the early to mid 20th century, Tilley was the site of a large annual fair.

Notable people

See also
List of communities in New Brunswick

References

Communities in Victoria County, New Brunswick